Lake Fork may refer to:

Lake Fork, Illinois, a village
Lake Fork Gunnison River, in Colorado
Lake Fork Mohican River, in Ohio
Lake Fork Creek, or Lake Fork of the Sabine River, in Texas
Lake Fork Reservoir, on Lake Fork Creek in Texas